The M115 engine family was a straight-4 automobile engine from Mercedes-Benz in the 1970s. The same engine was produced in several versions with differing volume, compression, and horse power according to its application.

M115.920
The M115.920 is a  engine with a power output . The cylinder bore on this type is 87 mm and piston stroke is 92.4 mm. This type shares the crankshaft with OM615 220D.

Applications:
 1968-1973 220 (W115.010) with oil radiator

M115.921
The M115.921 is a   engine.

Applications:
 L 408 G

M115.923
The M115.923 is a   engine.

Applications:
 1968-1976 200 (W115.015)

M115.924

Applications:
 1968-1973 220 (W115 coupé)

M115.926

Applications:
 1968-1977 220

M115.938

Applications:
 1975-1980 200

M115.939
The M115.939 is a 2.0-litre  engine with reduced compression, which follows from a different head.
Was e.g. built for export to Switzerland.

Applications:
 1976-1980 200

M115.951
The M115.951 is a 2.3-liter  engine.

Applications:
 1973-1979 230.4 (W115.017)

M115.952

Applications:
 409 LF Transporter

M115.954
The M115.954 is a  version with a  bore and the same  stroke.

Applications:
 1976-1981 230
 1976-1981 230C
 1976-1981 230T

M 115.973
The M 115.973 is a  version with a  bore and the same  stroke.

Applications:
 1979–1982 230 G
 1972–1990 230 GE

M 115.973 2.6 Brabus
The M 115.973 2.6 Brabus is a  version with a  bore and the same  stroke.

Applications:
 1989–1990 230 GE 2.6 Brabus

See also
 List of Mercedes-Benz engines

M115

Straight-four engines
Gasoline engines by model